The Great Western Railway (GWR) 6400 Class is a class of 0-6-0 pannier tank steam locomotive introduced by Charles Collett in 1932. All 40 examples were 'auto-fitted' – equipped with the remote-control equipment needed for working autotrains.

The 1936 GWR 7400 Class was a similar class, without the autotrain apparatus, but with a higher boiler pressure of 180 psi, providing a small but useful increase in power. An initial build of 30 in 1936-1937 was added to by British Railways in two batches each of ten locos in 1948 and 1950. These were destined for a short life, the briefest being only nine years. A minor visual difference between the 5400 and earlier 6400, and the later series of 6400, with the 7400 classes was at the join between cab and bunker. The 5400 and early 6400 had an arc whereas the later 6400 and the 7400 class was straight. The early locos also had a lip at the leading edge of the cab roof, whereas the later locos had a plain corner edge.

Both classes were closely related to the 1930 GWR 5400 Class, which was in turn an evolution of both the Armstrong 1874 GWR 850 Class and the Dean 1891 GWR 2021 Class. Thus the basic design was almost sixty years old when new, the  driving wheels being the main distinguishing factor, apart from the more modern profile. There were also superficial similarities with the GWR 645 Class as extant in the 1930s, that also had  wheels and  stroke cylinders (and by then pannier tanks and full cabs).

Operations
The smaller wheels of the 6400's permitted operation in hillier locations than the 5400 Class and allocations were initially to the South Wales valleys.

Engines of class 6400 worked on many of the ex-GWR branch lines in Devon and around Plymouth until the early 1960s, when the lines closed or diesel multiple units took over services. No. 6430 was a regular engine on the old Tavistock South branch line and would often run with two autocoaches. No. 6412 was based at Gloucester loco shed and operated the last 'Chalford Shuttle' autotrain service between Gloucester and Chalford in 1962.

Being allocated to Plymouth Laira, the type was tried on the line between Lostwithiel and Fowey although the normal engine was a 1400 Class 0-4-2.

Numbering
There were 40 locomotives in the 6400 Class, numbered 6400-6439 and 50 locomotives in the 7400 Class, numbered 7400-7449.

Withdrawal
The below list shows when all of the original 6400's and later 7400's were withdrawn from service. The members of the GWR 6400 Class and the GWR 7400 Class were No. 6419 and No. 7439 respectively.

Preservation

Three of the 6400 Class have survived to preservation:

In fiction
A 6400 Class loco (no. 6412) was the title character of the British 1970s TV series The Flockton Flyer, which was filmed on the West Somerset Railway where the preserved locomotive was based. (No. 6412 was relocated to the South Devon Railway in 2009.)

Models

Dapol manufacture a model of the 64xx in O scale. 
Bachmann have recently begun producing models in OO gauge with no. 6407 in GWR unlined green, no. 6417 in BR unlined black and no. 6412 in BR lined Brunswick Green, with an N gauge version (under the Graham Farish brand) to follow shortly with no. 6407 in GWR unlined green, no. 6403 in BR unlined black and no. 6400 in BR lined Brunswick Green.

See also
 GWR 0-6-0PT – list of classes of GWR 0-6-0 pannier tank, including table of preserved locomotives

References

External links 

 No. 6412 at the South Devon Railway
 No. 6430 at the Llangollen Railway
 No. 6435 at the Bodwin & Wenford Railway 
 Guide to GWR Pannier Tank Classes

0-6-0PT locomotives
6400
Railway locomotives introduced in 1932
Standard gauge steam locomotives of Great Britain
Passenger locomotives